Farwaniya Stadium is a multi-use stadium in Al-Farwaniyah, Kuwait.  It is generally used for football matches and is the home stadium of Al Tadamun SC, a professional football club.  The stadium holds 14,000 people.

External links
Stadium information 

Football venues in Kuwait